The Vikhra, or Vichra is a river in Smolensky, Krasninsky, and Monastyrshchinsky Districts of Smolensk Oblast, Russia, and Mstsislaw District of Mogilev Region, Belarus, a right tributary of the Sozh, flows through Monastyrshchinsky District and is  long. The urban-type settlement of Monastyrshchina is located on the banks of the Vikhra. The Battle of the Vikhra River occurred in the area.

The source of the Vikhra is close to the village of Korytnya in the southwest of Smolensk District, Smolensk Oblast, Russia. The Vikhra flows south, crosses the north-eastern corner of Krasninsky District and enters Monastyrshchinsky District. In Monastyrshchina it turns west and in the village of Skreplevo turns southwest. It crosses into Belarus downstream of the village of Bachenki. The mouth of the Vikhra is near the town of Mstsislaw.

References

Rivers of Smolensk Oblast
Rivers of Mogilev Region
International rivers of Europe
Rivers of Belarus